"Because of You" is a popular song, written by Arthur Hammerstein and Dudley Wilkinson in 1940. It was first recorded by Larry Clinton and His Orchestra on December 12, 1940, and was released March 28, 1941 on Bluebird 11094. It charted for one week (June 28) and ranked number 95 in the 1941 year-end list.

It was used in the 1951 film I Was an American Spy.

Tony Bennett recording
A 1951 recording by Tony Bennett, Columbia Records catalog number 39362, recorded on April 4, 1951 with orchestral backing conducted by Percy Faith, was Bennett’s first major hit, reaching number one on the Billboard charts and staying there for 10 weeks. Due to its importance in establishing his fame, he continued to perform the song for the rest of his career, even singing it at his final concert performances 70 years after its release.

Notable cover versions
In 1951, there were several artists covering the song:
A cover version by Johnny Desmond reached number seventeen at the same time as the Bennett recording.
Tab Smith released an R&B instrumental version which was number one on the R&B chart and number 20 on the pop chart. 
In 1963, a doo-wop group The Dreamers (from Yonkers/Bronx NY) recorded a classic uptempo version that is highly regarded among collectors.
In 1967, a live recording was made by Chris Montez, whose version peaked at number 71 on the U.S. pop chart and number 25 on the Easy Listening chart.

See also
List of number-one singles of 1951 (U.S.)
List of number-one rhythm and blues hits (United States)
List of number-one singles in Australia during the 1950s

References

1940 songs
1951 singles
1967 singles
Chris Montez songs
Tony Bennett songs
Johnny Desmond songs
Number-one singles in Australia
Number-one singles in the United States
Instrumentals